Negri may refer to:

Negri (surname), including a list of individuals with the name
Negri bodies, in microbiology
Negri, Bacău, a commune and a village in Bacău County, Romania
Edsel Torres Gomez, a Puerto Rican drug dealer, nicknamed Negri